Group 3 of the UEFA Euro 1976 qualifying tournament was one of the eight groups to decide which teams would qualify for the UEFA Euro 1976 finals tournament. Group 3 consisted of four teams: Yugoslavia, Northern Ireland, Sweden, and Norway, where they played against each other home-and-away in a round-robin format. The group winners were Yugoslavia, who finished four points above Northern Ireland.

Final table

Matches

 (*)NOTE: Attendance also reported as 45,000

 (*)NOTE: Attendance also reported as 40,000

Goalscorers

References
 
 
 

Group 3
1974–75 in Yugoslav football
1975–76 in Yugoslav football
1974–75 in Northern Ireland association football
1975–76 in Northern Ireland association football
1974 in Swedish football
1975 in Swedish football
1974 in Norwegian football
1975 in Norwegian football
Yugoslavia at UEFA Euro 1976